Said Belmokhtar (born 25 April 1984) is a Ukrainian footballer currently playing with FC Vorkuta in the Canadian Soccer League.

Career 
Belmokhtar is the product of the FC Odesa and the Odesa Youth Sports School "Spartak" named after I. Belanov. At the professional level, he made his debut in the 2000–2001 season for Chornomorets-2 in the Ukrainian Second League. For the main team, Chornomorets he played in two games during the 2000–2001 season in the Ukrainian First League. He later played in the Odesa region with FC Palmira Odesa, and Bilyayivka. In 2007, he played abroad in the Belarusian Premier League with Smorgon.

After two seasons abroad he returned to the Ukrainian Second League with FC Bastion Illichivsk, where he finished as the top scorer in Group A. In the winter of 2010-2011 he moved to FC Sumy. In July 2011, he returned to the Ukrainian First League by signing with Niva Vinnytsia, but terminated his contract during the winter transfer window to sign with FC Odesa. He later spent time in the Ukrainian Second League with Slavutych Cherkassy, Krystal Kherson, and for the FC Real Pharma Odesa.

In 2018, he played abroad for a second spell in the Canadian Soccer League with FC Vorkuta. The following season he played with Kingsman SC, where he finished as the club's top goalscorer with eights goals. In 2021, he returned to his former club Vorkuta.

Honors 
FC Bastion Illichivsk 
 Ukrainian Second League Golden Boot Group A: 2010–11

References

External links 
 Profile at PFL official website
 
 

1984 births
Living people
Sportspeople from Almaty
Ukrainian footballers
Association football forwards
Ukrainian expatriate footballers
Expatriate footballers in Belarus
FC Chornomorets Odesa players
PFC Sumy players
FC Nyva Vinnytsia players
FC Smorgon players
Ukrainian people of Kazakhstani descent
FC Chornomorets-2 Odesa players
FC Bastion Illichivsk players
FC Dnister Ovidiopol players
FC Cherkashchyna players
FC Krystal Kherson players
FC Real Pharma Odesa players
FC Continentals players
Ukrainian First League players
Belarusian Premier League players
Canadian Soccer League (1998–present) players
Ukrainian Second League players
21st-century Ukrainian people